The First Battle of Hanna (Turkish: Felahiye Muharebesi) was a World War I battle fought on the Mesopotamian front on 21 January 1916 between Ottoman Army and Anglo-Indian forces.

Prelude
After the Ottoman Empire's entry into the First World War, Britain dispatched Indian Expeditionary Force D to seize control of the Shatt al Arab and the port of Basra in order to safeguard British oil interests in the Persian Gulf. Eventually, the Anglo-Indian force's mission evolved into the capture of Baghdad. However, despite victories at Qurna, Nasiryeh, and Es Sinn, the primary offensive component of I.E.F. "D", the 6th (Poona) Division withdrew southwards after the Battle of Ctesiphon. The Ottoman forces in the region, reinforced and emboldened by the withdrawal from the gates of Baghdad, pursued the Anglo-Indian force to the town of Kut-al-Amara. Strategically situated at the confluence of the Shatt al-Hayy and the Tigris River, the commander of the Poona Division decided to defend the town. 

On 15 December 1915, Ottoman troops had surrounded the Anglo-Indian force of about 10,000 men at the town of Kut-al-Amara. The British commander Major General Charles Townshend called for help, and the commander of the Mesopotamian theatre General Sir John Nixon began assembling a force of 19,000 men to relieve the besieged forces. This relief force, designated as the Tigris Corps, initially consisted of 2 divisions: 3rd (Lahore) Division and 7th (Meerut) Division, as well other units available in the region.

This relief force, commanded by Lieutenant General Fenton Aylmer, suffered two setbacks during its initial January 1916 offensive (see the Battle of Wadi). After these defeats, the relief force (now reduced to around 10,000 men) was ordered once again to attempt to break through the Ottoman lines and continued its movement up the Tigris until it encountered 30,000 men of the Ottoman Sixth Army, under the command of Khalil Pasha, at the Hanna defile, 30 miles downriver of Kut-al-Amara.

Battle
After a short bombardment on 20 and 21 January 1916, the 7th Division charged the Ottoman lines. In an advance across 600 yards of flooded no-man's land, the British sustained 2,700 casualties. The well prepared Ottoman positions, notably the well-sited machine gun nests, forced them to abandon the assault and withdraw the relief force to the base of Ali Gharbi.

Aftermath
Medical care was practically nonexistent, and the night after the attack saw freezing temperatures. Many British wounded suffered unnecessarily, and morale plummeted. The besieged garrison in Kut-al-Amara could hear the distant sound of the fighting relief force, and when it remained distant morale there suffered as well.

Despite two more relief attempts, the garrison at Kut-al-Amara was forced to surrender to the Ottoman forces on 29 April 1916 (see Siege of Kut).

Notes

Battles of the Mesopotamian campaign
Battles of World War I involving the United Kingdom
Battles of World War I involving the Ottoman Empire
Battles of World War I involving British India